Pedro Henrique Perotti (born 22 November 1997), known as Pedro Perotti or simply Perotti, is a Brazilian professional footballer who plays as a forward for J1 League club FC Tokyo, on loan from Chapecoense.

Club career
Born in Seberi but raised in Rodeio Bonito, both in Rio Grande do Sul, Perotti was a Chapecoense youth graduate. He made his senior debut on 12 March 2016, coming on as a late substitute in a 4–0 Campeonato Catarinense home win against Camboriú.

Perotti did not board LaMia Airlines Flight 2933 for the 2016 Copa Sudamericana Finals, which crashed and killed 19 of his teammates. He made his Série A debut on 23 June 2017, replacing Luis Manuel Seijas in a 1–5 away loss against Flamengo.

Perotti scored his first senior goal on 2 March 2019, netting the winner in a 2–1 home success over Metropolitano. On 18 June, after failing to establish himself as a starter, Perotti was loaned to Portuguese Primeira Liga side C.D. Nacional for one year. 

Perotti returned from loan in August 2020, with his parent club now in the Série B. He contributed with four goals in 21 appearances, as his side returned to the top tier as champions.

Perotti became a regular starter in the 2021 Catarinense, and scored 15 goals in the competition, which included a hat-trick in a 3–1 home win against Próspera. On 6 April of that year, he renewed his contract until 2024.

On 3 January 2023, Perotti agreed to join to FC Tokyo on loan until January 2024, the end of J1 League season.

Career statistics

Honours
Chapecoense
Campeonato Catarinense: 2016
Campeonato Brasileiro Série B: 2020

References

External links

1997 births
Living people
Sportspeople from Rio Grande do Sul
Brazilian footballers
Brazilian expatriate footballers
Association football forwards
Campeonato Brasileiro Série A players
Campeonato Brasileiro Série B players
Liga Portugal 2 players
Associação Chapecoense de Futebol players
C.D. Nacional players
FC Tokyo players
J1 League players
Brazilian expatriate sportspeople in Portugal
Expatriate footballers in Portugal
Brazilian expatriate sportspeople in Japan
Expatriate footballers in Japan